Gvat (also transliterated Gevat) is a kibbutz in northern Israel. Located near Migdal HaEmek in the Jezreel Valley, it falls under the jurisdiction of Jezreel Valley Regional Council. The kibbutz founded the Plastro company, one of the world's largest drip irrigation systems manufacturers.

History
Archaeological evidence, including columns and masonry inscribed with Latin, shows that a first-century BCE Judeo-Roman settlement existed at the site.

By the modern era, a village by the name of Jebata (also spelt Jabata, Jebatha, Jibbata and Jibta) had been established 25 kilometres southeast of Haifa on a mound in the Galilee, not far from the villages of Yafa an-Naseriyye, al-Mujaydil and Ma'alul, and which Palmer of the Palestine Exploration Fund had wrongly identified with Jotapata. The village and its name are identified with the ancient town of Gabatha, which is mentioned by Eusebius of Caesarea and Jerome as lying within the borders of Diocaesarea near the great plain of Legio or Esdraelon.

Ottoman era
In the Ottoman era, a map from Napoleon's invasion of 1799 by Pierre Jacotin  showed the place, named as Gebat, but the position was misplaced, as that area was not surveyed directly by the French.

In 1875 Victor Guérin gave the population as 350, noting "It is situated upon a low hillock, once occupied by a small tower, of which nothing remains but confused debris. A few cut stones scattered on the slopes and on the upper part of the hill are what is left of the Gabatha mentioned by Jerome in the Onomasticon."
In 1881  the Palestine Exploration Fund's Survey of Western Palestine described Jebata as a small adobe hamlet, containing 80 people and cultivating 21 feddans.

Laurence Oliphant wrote of a visit he made to Jebata which was published in the Quarterly Statement of the Palestine Exploration Fund in January 1885. He relates the discovery by the villagers of what appeared to be a large underground tomb, describing a chamber of solid masonry with a vaulted roof and other chambers hewn from the rock.

A population list from about 1887 showed that the village had about 200 inhabitants, all of whom were Muslims. Gottlieb Schumacher, as part of surveying for the construction of the Jezreel Valley railway, noted in 1900 that Jebata had  grown considerably; "The proprietor, Sursock, built a number of dwellings covered with tile roofs, cleaned the well on the eastern slope and lined it with masonry."

British Mandate era

At the time of the 1922 census of Palestine, the village had a population of 318; 308 Muslims and 10 Christians, with nine Orthodox and one Armenian Christian.

The area was acquired by the Jewish community as part of the Sursock Purchase. Jebata was one of five villages purchased by the Jewish National Fund (JNF) in 1924; the others being Afuleh, Sulam, Shatta and Knayfis. The villages had a combined population of about 3,000 to 4,000 people. Because the villagers paid tithes to the Sursock family in Beirut for the right to work the agricultural lands in the villages, they were deemed tenant farmers by the British Mandate authorities in Palestine, and the right of the Sursock family to sell the land to the JNF was upheld by the authorities. The built-up areas of the village, which included people's homes, were not the property of the Sursocks, but without land to cultivate, the transaction left the villagers without their means of livelihood. Jebata was later named by Moshe Dayan in his 1969 statement that there was not a single place in Israel that did not have a former Arab population.

On 28 November 1926, a kibbutz named Gvat was established on the site of Jebata by a group of  Fourth Aliyah pioneers from Pinsk. In 1922, the first kibbutz members had formed a kvutza in memory of the 35 members of the Jewish community of Pinsk killed by the Polish Army on 5 April 1919 during the Pinsk massacre. The kibbutz was named after Givta, a town located near Sepphoris during the period of the Second Temple. In 1931 with the help of the Jewish National Fund and donations from Pinsk's Jewish community, a forest commemorating the victims of the Pinsk massacre was planted near Gvat.

The kibbutz was established on classical Labor Zionist principles and there has never been a synagogue in the village. New members arrived, including Poalei Zion members from Pinsk and its surrounding region, as well as by members of HeHalutz from Poland and Germany. By the 1931 census Gvat had  a population of 106; one Muslim and 105 Jews, in a total of 19 houses.

State of Israel
In 1951, following the split in the HaKibbutz HaMeuhad movement, some of Gvat's members left the kibbutz and together with members of Kvutzat HaSharon founded a new kibbutz named Ihud HaSharon - Gvat, which was later renamed Yif'at in 1952.

On 6 October 1973, during the Yom Kippur War, Soviet-made surface-to-surface FROG-7 missiles launched by Syria struck Gvat, presumably aimed at a nearby airfield. Despite extensive damage to the buildings, there were no casualties, since the inhabitants had been sleeping in underground shelters.

Demographics

Economy
The irrigation equipment manufacturing company Plastro was established in 1966 by the kibbutz. Plastro is the world's second largest drip irrigation company after Netafim (also from Israel). Plastro and Netafim, together with Israel's other irrigation equipment company NaanDan Irrigation Systems, control roughly half the world market, worth from $1 to $1.5 billion a year.

In 2005 Australian billionaire John Gandel, acquired 50% interest in Plastro Irrigation Systems. But in May 2007 the kibbutz, using a loan from John Deere & Company, exercised an option to buy back the shares.

In 2008 the kibbutz agreed to sell its 75.1% stake at Plastro Irrigation Systems Ltd to John Deere at a company value of NIS 265 million.
John Deere was obliged to leave Plastro at the kibbutz employing members for 15 years. Also John Deere agreed to pay Gvat $1.3 million annually over ten years for a non-competition agreement. In exchange the kibbutz agreed to cease receiving management fees for Plastro.

Another sector of Gvat's economy is agriculture. Field crops, citrus fruit, dairy, poultry, ostriches are also farmed and produced in Gvat.

Culture
The kibbutz runs the Bet Herschel theater, named after one of the kibbutz founders, where movies and stage productions are shown. The kibbutz also has a regional sports center.

There are monuments in Gvat commemorating those who perished during the Holocaust and the Pinsk massacre.

A member of Gvat wrote in 1940 the song about the green truck that picks up milk and eggs from one kibbutz after the other and takes them to the Tnuva factory, a song which is until today known by virtually every Israeli young child.

Notable people
 Fania Bergstein (1908–1950), Hebrew poet
 Haim Gvati (1901–1990), Minister of Agriculture of Israel between 1964 and 1974
 Guni Israeli (born 1984), basketball player
 Daniel Libeskind (born 1946), architect who lived in Gvat between 1960 and 1962

References

Bibliography

External links
 Gvat website 
 Map of Gvat
The Blooms at Kibbutz Gvat: Alone in Communal Life
   Jubbata, from Dr. Moslih Kanaaneh
Survey of Western Palestine, Map 5:    IAA, Wikimedia commons 

Kibbutzim
Kibbutz Movement
Populated places established in 1926
Populated places in Northern District (Israel)
1926 establishments in Mandatory Palestine
Villages depopulated during the Arab–Israeli conflict
Belarusian-Jewish culture in Israel